Carlos Alexandre Torres (born 22 August 1966), known as Alexandre Torres, is a Brazilian retired professional footballer who played as a defender. His father is former footballer Carlos Alberto Torres.

Career

Club career
Torres played professionally in Brazil and Japan for Fluminense, Vasco da Gama and Nagoya Grampus Eight.
At Nagoya Grampus he was signed by then manager Arsène Wenger, who seemed to recognise his agent's face from somewhere – bemused to find out it was his father and Brazil legend Carlos Alberto.

International career
Torres was called up to the Brazil national squad in 1992, making one international appearance.

References

External links
Player profile at SambaFoot.com

1966 births
Living people
Brazilian footballers
Footballers from Rio de Janeiro (city)
Brazilian expatriate footballers
Brazil international footballers
Fluminense FC players
CR Vasco da Gama managers
Nagoya Grampus players
Campeonato Brasileiro Série A players
J1 League players
Expatriate footballers in Japan
Association football defenders
Brazilian football managers